Carl Alan Wilson (8 May 1940 – 24 January 2019) was an English professional footballer who played in the Football League for Gateshead, Doncaster Rovers, Millwall and Newcastle United as a centre forward. He also played in the Netherlands and Germany for Sparta Rotterdam and Schwarz-Weiß Essen respectively.

Personal life 
Wilson's father Joe was also a professional footballer, most notably for Southend United.

Career statistics

References 

1940 births
2019 deaths
English footballers
Newcastle United F.C. players
Northern Football League players
English Football League players
English football managers
Blyth Spartans A.F.C. managers
Consett A.F.C. managers
Sportspeople from Consett
Footballers from County Durham
Association football forwards
Gateshead F.C. players
Doncaster Rovers F.C. players
Millwall F.C. players
Sparta Rotterdam players
Schwarz-Weiß Essen players
Eredivisie players
Regionalliga players
English expatriate footballers
English expatriate sportspeople in the Netherlands
English expatriate sportspeople in Germany
Expatriate footballers in the Netherlands
Expatriate footballers in Germany